The compound of eight octahedra with rotational freedom is a uniform polyhedron compound. It is composed of a symmetric arrangement of 8 octahedra, considered as triangular antiprisms. It can be constructed by superimposing eight identical octahedra, and then rotating them in pairs about the four axes that pass through the centres of two opposite octahedral faces. Each octahedron is rotated by an equal (and opposite, within a pair) angle θ.

It can be constructed by superimposing two compounds of four octahedra with rotational freedom, one with a rotation of θ, and the other with a rotation of −θ.

When θ = 0, all eight octahedra coincide. When θ is 60 degrees, the octahedra coincide in pairs yielding (two superimposed copies of) the compound of four octahedra.

Cartesian coordinates 
Cartesian coordinates for the vertices of this compound are all the permutations of

Gallery

References 
.

Polyhedral compounds